Dmitry Stepanovich Bortniansky (28 October 1751 – ) was a  Russian Imperial composer of Ukrainian Cossack origin. He was a composer, harpsichordist and conductor who served at the court of Catherine the Great. Bortniansky was critical to the musical history of both Ukraine and Russia, with both nations claiming him as their own.

Bortniansky, who has been compared to Palestrina, is known today for his liturgical works and prolific contributions to the genre of choral concertos. He was one of the "Golden Three" of his era, alongside Artemy Vedel and Maxim Berezovsky. Bortniansky was so popular in the Russian Empire that his figure was represented in 1862 in the bronze monument of the Millennium of Russia in the Novgorod Kremlin. He composed in many different musical styles, including choral compositions in French, Italian, Latin, German and Church Slavonic.

Biography

Student
Dmitry Bortniansky was born on 28 October 1751 in the city of Glukhov, Cossack Hetmanate, Russian Empire (in present-day Ukraine). His father was Stefan Skurat (or Shkurat), a Lemko-Rusyn Orthodox religious refugee from the village of Bartne in the Małopolska region of Poland. Skurat served as a Cossack under Kirill Razumovski; he was entered in the Cossack register in 1755. Dmitry's mother was of Cossack origin; her name after her first marriage was Marina Dmitrievna Tolstaya, as a widow of a Russian landlord Tolstoy, who lived in the city of Glukhov. At age seven, Dmitry's prodigious talent at the local church choir afforded him the opportunity to go the capital of the empire and sing with the Imperial Chapel Choir in Saint Petersburg. Dmitry's half brother Ivan Tolstoy also sang with the Imperial Chapel Choir. There Dmitry studied music and composition under the director of the Imperial Chapel Choir, the Italian master Baldassare Galuppi. When Galuppi left for Italy in 1769, he took the boy with him. In Italy, Bortniansky gained considerable success composing operas: Creonte (1776) and Alcide (1778) in Venice, and Quinto Fabio (1779) at Modena. He also composed sacred works in Latin and German, both a cappella and with orchestral accompaniment (including an Ave Maria for two voices and orchestra).

Master

Bortniansky returned to the Saint Petersburg Court Capella in 1779 and flourished creatively. He composed at least four more operas (all in French, with libretti by Franz-Hermann Lafermière): Le Faucon (1786), La fête du seigneur (1786), Don Carlos (1786), and Le fils-rival ou La moderne Stratonice (1787). Bortniansky wrote a number of instrumental works at this time, including piano sonatas, a piano quintet with harp, and a cycle of French songs. He also composed liturgical music for the Eastern Orthodox Church, combining the Eastern and Western European styles of sacred music, incorporating the polyphony he learned in Italy; some works were polychoral, using a style descended from the Venetian polychoral technique of the Gabrielis.

After a while, Bortniansky's genius proved too great to ignore, and in 1796 he was appointed Director of the Imperial Chapel Choir, the first director from the Russian Empire. With such a great instrument at his disposal, he produced scores upon scores of compositions, including over 100 religious works, sacred concertos (35 for four-part mixed choir, 10 for double choruses), cantatas, and hymns.

Bortniansky died in St. Petersburg on 10 October 1825, and was interred at the Smolensky Cemetery in St. Petersburg. His remains were transferred to the Alexander Nevsky Monastery in the 20th century.

Musical legacy
In 1882, Pyotr Tchaikovsky edited Bortniansky's liturgical works, which were published in ten volumes. Bortniansky wrote operas and instrumental compositions, but his sacred choral works are performed most often today. This vast body of work remains central not only to understanding 18th-century Orthodox sacred music, but also served as inspiration to his fellow Ukrainian composers in the 19th century.

The tune he wrote for the Latin hymn Tantum Ergo eventually became known in Slavic lands as Коль славен (Kol slaven), in which form it is still sung as a church hymn today. The tune was also popular with freemasons. It travelled to English-speaking countries and came to be known by the names Russia, St. Petersburg or Wells. In Germany, the song was paired with a text by Gerhard Tersteegen and became a well-known chorale and traditional part of the military ceremony Großer Zapfenstreich (the Grand Tattoo), the highest ceremonial act of the German army, rendered as an honor for distinguished persons on special occasions. Before the October revolution in 1917, the tune was played by the Moscow Kremlin carillon every day at midday.

James Blish, who novelized many episodes of the original series of Star Trek, noted in one story, Whom Gods Destroy, that Bortniansky's Ich bete an die Macht der Liebe was the theme "to which all Starfleet Academy classes marched to their graduation."

Bortniansky composed "The Angel Greeted the Gracious One" (hymn to the Mother of God used at Pascha) as a trio used by many Orthodox churches in the Easter season.

Influence 

Bortnyansky's work had a significant impact on the development of both Ukrainian and Russian music.

Almost half a century of Bortnyansky's life was associated with music education, with the most important processes of formation of musical culture in Russia, due to which he is considered a Russian composer in Russia. According to Russian musicologist Boris Asafyev, "Bortnyansky developed a style with characteristic inversions, which retained its influence for several following generations. These typical appeals not only reached Mikhail Glinka, but also Pyotr Ilyich Tchaikovsky, Nikolai Rimsky-Korsakov, and Alexander Borodin".

At the same time, beginning in the 1920s, Bortnyansky's work became the subject of special attention of Ukrainian musicians. Stanislav Lyudkevych's article "D. Bortnyansky and Contemporary Ukrainian Music" (1925) called on Ukrainian musicians to develop the traditions established by Bortnyansky, "to dive deeper and more thoroughly into the great cultural treasury concentrated in Bortnyansky's works, to find the sources in it and foundations of our revival". 

Traditionally, Ukrainian musicologists emphasize the use of intonations of Ukrainian folk songs in choral work, since the composer's first musical impressions were obtained in Ukraine, Ukrainians were also most of Bortnyansky's friends in the choir and his teacher Marko Poltoratsky. In particular, Lydia Korniy notes: 
typical for Ukrainian songs descending lyrical sixth V - VII # - I degree (on the example of choral concerts: № 13, end of the II part, and № 28, finale)
typical inversions with a reduced fourth between III and VII # degrees in minor,
typical for lyrical songs mournful intonations with an increased second between III and IV # degrees in minor.
Lyudkevych also notes Ukrainian intonations in Bortnyansky's works:

The influence of Bortnyansky's work is noted in the works of Ukrainian composers Mykola Lysenko, Kyrylo Stetsenko, M. Verbytsky, Mykola Leontovych, M. Dremlyuga, Levko Revutsky, K. Dominchen, B. Lyatoshynsky, and others.

Works

Operas
Creonte (1776 Venice)
Alcide (1778 Venice)
Quinto Fabio (1779 Modena)
Le faucon (1786 Gatchina in French, with libretto by Franz-Hermann Lafermière)
La Fête du seigneur (1786 Pavlovsk in French, with libretto by Franz-Hermann Lafermière)
Don Carlos (1786 St Petersburg in French, with libretto by Franz-Hermann Lafermière)
Le Fils-Rival ou La Moderne Stratonice (1787 Pavlovsk in French, with libretto by Franz-Hermann Lafermière)

Choruses (in Old Church Slavonic) 
Da ispravitsia molitva moja ("Let My Prayer Arise") no. 2.
Kjeruvimskije pjesni (Cherubic Hymns) nos. 1-7
Concerto No. 1: Vospoitje Gospodjevi ("Sing unto the Lord")
Concerto No. 6: Slava vo vyshnikh Bogu, y na zemli mir ("Glory to God in the highest, and peace on earth")
Concerto No. 7: Priiditje, vozradujemsja Gospodjevi ("Come Let Us Rejoice")
Concerto No. 9: Sei djen', jego zhe Gospodi, konchinu moju
Concerto No. 11: Blagoslovjen Gospod''' ("Blessed is the Lord")
Concerto No. 15: Priiditje, vospoim, ljudijeConcerto No. 18: Blago jest ispovjedatsja ("It Is Good To Praise the Lord", Psalm 92)
Concerto No. 19: Rjechje Gospod' Gospodjevi mojemu ("The Lord Said unto My Lord", Psalm 110)
Concerto No. 21: Zhyvyi v pomoshshi Vyshnjago ("He That Dwelleth", Psalm 91)
Concerto No. 24: Vozvjedokh ochi moi v gory ("I Lift Up My Eyes to the Mountains")
Concerto No. 27: Glasom moim ko Gospodu vozzvakh ("With My Voice I Cried Out to the Lord")
Concerto No. 32: Skazhy mi, Gospodi, konchinu moju ("Lord, Make Me Know My End")
Concerto No. 33: Vskuju priskorbna jesi dusha moja'' ("Why Are You Downcast, O My Soul?", Psalm 42:5)

Concerto-Symphony
Concerto-Symphony for Piano, Harp, Two Violins, Viola da gamba, Cello and Bassoon in B Flat Major (1790).

Quintet
Quintet for Piano, Harp, Violin, Viola da gamba and Cello (1787).

Notes

References

Bibliography

External links

 Bortniansky, Dmitri Stepanovich in Columbia Encyclopedia
Bortniansky: Main biography in Russian by Konstantin Kovalev (Константин Ковалев) - eng. and All about Dmitry Bortniansky + Usual mistakes in the biography of the composer (present time) - eng.
 Bortniansky, Dmytro in Encyclopedia of Ukraine
 Bortniansky, Dmitri Stepanovich in The Cyber Hymnal
 Bortniansky, Dmitri Stepanovich in Karadar Classical Music
 Musicus Bortnianskii, a chamber choir from Toronto which specializes in Bortniansky performance and research

 Choral Concerti performed by The Bortniansky Chamber Choir, Chernihiv (VIDEO)

1751 births
1825 deaths
People from Hlukhiv
People from the Cossack Hetmanate
Ukrainian people in the Russian Empire
Russian Orthodox Christians from Ukraine
Classical-period composers
Classical composers of church music
Russian male classical composers
Russian opera composers
Male opera composers
Ukrainian classical composers
Ukrainian conductors (music)
Male conductors (music)
18th-century classical composers
18th-century male musicians
18th-century musicians
19th-century classical composers
19th-century male musicians
19th-century musicians
Burials at Tikhvin Cemetery